Carmen Vela Olmo (born 25 March 1955) is a Spanish entrepreneur, researcher and former Secretary of State of Investigation, Development and Innovation.

Biography 
Born on 25 March 1955 in Sigüenza, Spain, she graduated in Chemical Sciences from the Faculty of Chemical Sciences of the Universidad Complutense of Madrid and specialised in Biochemistry.

In 1982 she started working for Ingenasa (Inmunología y Genética Aplicada), a company dedicated biotechnology, created by the National Institute of Industry and moved  to the Centre of Molecular Biology Severo Ochoa, in the Autonomous University of Madrid. In 1988, Ingenasa is privatised and bought by Ercros. After the bankruptcy of Ercros, Vela and other two partners bought out Ingenasa. From 1994, Vela is the general director of Ingenasa.

Vela is the author of numerous scientific publications and patents approved in United States and Europe. She participates to evaluation committees of national and European programs and organisations, like the Advisory Board of the program PEOPLE of the VII Framework Programmes for Research and Technological Developmentof the European Union, the management council of the CSIC or the advisory council for science and technology of the Spanish ministries of Science and Technology, Education and Science, and Science and Innovation. Until October 2010 she was president of the Association of Women Researchers and Technologists (AMIT). From September 2010 until January 2012 she was president of the Spanish Society of Biotechnology (SEBIOT).

In January 2012, she became Secretary of State of Investigation, Development and Innovation, with Prime Minister Mariano Rajoy and Luis de Guindos as minister of Economy and Competitiveness. 

She is married and has two children.

References 

Spanish biochemists
20th-century Spanish businesswomen
20th-century Spanish businesspeople
1955 births
People from the Province of Guadalajara
Complutense University of Madrid alumni
21st-century women scientists
Living people
Grand Cross of the Order of Civil Merit
Spanish women chemists
21st-century Spanish businesswomen
21st-century Spanish businesspeople
Secretaries of State of Spain